The Shilov system is a classic example of catalytic C-H bond activation and oxidation which preferentially activates stronger C-H bonds over weaker C-H bonds for an overall partial oxidation.

Overview 
The Shilov system was discovered by Alexander E. Shilov in 1969-1972 while investigating H/D exchange between isotopologues of CH4 and H2O catalyzed simple transition metal 
coordination complexes.  The Shilov cycle is the partial oxidation of a hydrocarbon to an alcohol or alcohol precursor (RCl) catalyzed by PtIICl2 in an aqueous solution with [PtIVCl6]2− acting as the ultimate oxidant.  The cycle consists of three major steps, the electrophilic activation of the C-H bond, oxidation of the complex, and the nucleophilic oxidation of the alkane substrate.  An equivalent transformation is performed industrially by steam reforming methane to syngas then reducing the carbon monoxide to methanol.  The transformation can also performed biologically by methane monooxygenase. 

Overall Transformation

RH + H2O + [PtCl6]2− → ROH + 2H+ + PtCl2 + 4Cl−

Major steps 

The initial and rate limiting step involving the electrophilic activation of RH2C-H by a PtII center to produce a PtII-CH2R species and a proton. The mechanism of this activation is debated. One possibility is the oxidative addition of a sigma coordinated C-H bond followed by the reductive removal of the proton. Another is a sigma-bond metathesis involving the formation of the M-C bond and a H-Cl or H-O bond. Regardless it is this step that kinetically imparts the chemoselectivity to the overall transformation. Stronger, more electron-rich bonds are activated preferentially over weaker, more electron-poor bonds of species that have already been partially oxidized. This avoids a problem that plagues many partial oxidation processes, namely, the over-oxidation of substrate to thermodynamic sinks such as H2O and CO2.

In the next step the PtII-CH2R complex is oxidized by [PtIVCl6]2− to a PtIV-CH2R complex.  There have been multiple studies to find a replacement oxidant that is less expensive than [PtIVCl6]2− or a method to regenerate [PtIVCl6]2−.  It would be most advantageous to develop an electron train which would use oxygen as the ultimate oxidant.  It is important that the oxidant preferentially oxidizes the PtII-CH2R species over the initial PtII species since PtIV complexes will not electrophilically activate a C-H bond of the alkane (although PtIV complexes electrophilically substitute hydrogens in aromatics - see refs. [1] and [2] ).  Such premature oxidation shuts down the catalysis.

Finally the PtIV-CH2R undergoes nucleophilic attack by OH− or Cl− with the departure of  PtII complex to regenerate the catalyst.

References 

Organometallic chemistry
Catalysis